The United States Business and Industry Council (USBIC) is an NGO lobbying on behalf of family-owned and closely held US manufacturing companies. It was founded in 1933.

Mission

The mission of the USBIC is "to expand our domestic economy, with particular emphasis on our manufacturing, processing, and fabricating industries, and through the resulting growth to extend a high standard of living to all Americans."

References

External links

American Economic Alert. USBIC funded web site.

Lobbying organizations in the United States